ZeroAvia is a British/American hydrogen-electric aircraft developer. The company was founded in 2017 by Valery Miftakhov, who currently serves as the company CEO. ZeroAvia is developing hydrogen-fueled powertrain technology aiming to compete with conventional engines in propeller aircraft, with an aim of zero-emission and lower noise. According to the company, by 2026, ZeroAvia intends to fly an aircraft over 500 miles range in aircraft with up to 80 seats.

History

Piper PA-46 
In 2019, the company completed flight tests of the electrical aspects of the initial powertrain design, where it was later reported that an external hydrogen tank was fitted to a Piper Matrix.

The company moved to a facility in Cranfield, England in 2020. Installation and test of the ZA250 hydrogen–electric powertrain in a six-seat Piper Malibu took place at Cranfield during 2020, culminating in an eight-minute first flight of the hydrogen-electric Malibu in September that year. It was the company's first commercial-scale hydrogen-electric-powered flight. In December 2020, the company was awarded £12.3 million, from the UK Government's ATI Programme, to develop a 19-seat hydrogen powered aircraft with a  flight to be completed by 2023.

In March 2021, ZeroAvia launched development for a 2 MW hydrogen-electric powertrain for full-size regional aircraft. The following month, the company announced it would develop the HyFlyer II aircraft at Cotswold Airport. On April 29, 2021, ZeroAvia's hydrogen-powered Piper PA-46-350P demonstrator testbed crashed in a field during a flight from Cranfield. No one was seriously hurt in the accident, but the aircraft received substantial damage, losing its left wing, after it was forced to land following a power system test. Investigation revealed that when the battery was disconnected to test operation on the fuel cell alone, excessive voltage generated by the motor turned by the propeller caused a protective shutdown of the motor's inverter.

Dornier 228 

ZeroAvia obtained two Dornier 228 aircraft for the next phase of its 19-seat HyFlyer program in June 2021.
In August 2021, ZeroAvia completed its first high-power run of the ZA-600, a hydrogen aircraft engine. Ground testing included a flight-intent  powertrain, which pulled a 15-ton HyperTruck mobile ground testing platform across the tarmac. The HyperTruck tests systems for 40-80 seat hydrogen-electric powered aircraft and is sized to ZeroAvia’s ZA-2000 + powertrain. These propulsion system tests are for the HyFlyer II programme, which hopes to develop a hydrogen-electric, zero-emission propulsion system for airframes 10-20 seats in size. Later in 2021, the first HyFlyer II’s Dornier 228 aircraft test-flights were anticipated to take place at the Kemble facility.

In 2022, the company announced a partnership with Otto Aviation to build a hydrogen-powered version of the Otto Celera 500L aircraft.
That same year, Textron Aviation and ZeroAvia partnered for the development of a hydrogen-electric powertrain for the Cessna Grand Caravan.

On 19 January 2023, ZeroAvia flew its Dornier 228 testbed for 10 minutes with one TPE331 turboprop replaced by a prototype hydrogen-electric powertrain in the cabin, consisting of two fuel cells and a lithium-ion battery for peak power. The aim is to have a certifiable configuration by 2025.

The test campaign is planned for 10 to 20 flights. The commercial platform is intended to be a 10- to 20-seat aircraft.

Operations

Finances

2020 
Announced December 16, 2020, ZeroAvia raised $21.4 million in Series A financing led by the Bill Gates-backed power investing fund, Breakthrough Energy Ventures and environmental sustainability VC firm Ecosystem Integrity Fund. Existing investors Sweden's Summa Equity, the venture investing arm of Royal Dutch Shell, private individual Ihar Mahaniok, Hong Kong fund Horizons Ventures, and Amazon's Climate Pledge Fund also participated. At the same time, the firm also received a grant from London-based the Aerospace Technology Institute, Innovate UK, and the UK's Department for Business, Energy & Industrial Strategy, totalling $16.3 million.

2021 
Announced on March 31, 2021, ZeroAvia raised $24.3 million in a second round of Series A financing. This round was led by existing investor Horizons Ventures and included previous investors Breakthrough Energy Ventures, Royal Dutch Shell, Summa Equity, and SYSTEMIQ, alongside new investor British Airways.

Announced on June 29, 2021, ZeroAvia raised $13 million from six existing investors–Breakthrough, Climate Pledge Fund, Horizons, Shell, Summa, and SYSTEMIQ–with four new investors coming on-board, including SGH Capital, AP Ventures, Alumni Ventures, and Agartha Fund LP.

Announced on December 13, 2021, ZeroAvia raised $35 million in Series B financing that brought in new investors United Airlines Ventures and the Alaska Air Group, alongside previous investors AP Ventures, Horizons Ventures, Royal Dutch Shell, Breakthrough Energy Ventures, Summa Equity, and Amazon's Climate Pledge Fund.

References

External links

Hydrogen-powered aircraft
Sustainable technologies
Aircraft designers
Companies established in 2017